Let's Make a Deal (also known as LMAD) is a television game show that originated in the United States in 1963 and has since been produced in many countries throughout the world. The program was created and produced by Stefan Hatos and Monty Hall, the latter serving as its host for nearly 30 years.

The format of Let's Make a Deal involves selected members of the studio audience, referred to as "traders", making deals with the host. In most cases, a trader will be offered something of value and given a choice of whether to keep it or exchange it for a different item. The program's defining game mechanism is that the other item is hidden from the trader until that choice is made. The trader thus does not know if they are getting something of equal or greater value or a prize that is referred to as a "zonk," an item purposely chosen to be of little or no value to the trader.

Let's Make a Deal is also known for audience members who dress in outrageous costumes in order to increase their chances of being selected as a trader.

The current edition of Let's Make a Deal has aired on CBS since October 5, 2009, when it took over the spot on the network's daytime schedule vacated by the long-running soap opera Guiding Light. Wayne Brady is the host of the current series, with Jonathan Mangum as his announcer/assistant. Tiffany Coyne is the current model, joining in 2010, with musician Cat Gray in 2011.

Starting in fall 2020, Let's Make a Deal began filming with a hybrid of audience members in-studio seated in pods as well as virtual contestants playing from their homes due to the ongoing COVID-19 pandemic (nicknamed "At-Homies"). According to executive producer John Quinn, all COVID-19 protocols are in effect during production, including social distancing, testing, masks (only for crewmembers and while off set), and personal protective equipment.

The 13th season of the current version premiered on September 13, 2021. Three primetime episodes were filmed and aired during the season. The 14th season premiered on September 19, 2022. As has been the case since Season 12, primetime episodes will air during the 2022-23 season.

The show is owned by Marcus/Glass Productions, a joint venture of Marcus Entertainment (Marcus Lemonis) and Nancy Glass following an August 2021 acquisition of Hatos-Hall assets, with Sharon Hall, a former Endemol Shine executive, as the consultant. From January 2022, CAN'T STOP media will be in charge of the format's international distribution.

Broadcast history
Let's Make a Deal first aired on NBC on December 30, 1963 as part of its daytime schedule. The show moved to ABC on December 30, 1968, where it remained until July 9, 1976; and on two occasions the show was given a weekly nighttime spot on those networks. The first syndicated edition of Let's Make a Deal premiered on August 30, 1971. Distributed by ABC Films, and then by its successor Worldvision Enterprises once the fin-syn rules were enacted, the series ran until 1977 and aired weekly.

A revival of the series based in Hall's native Canada was launched in 1980 and aired in syndication on American and Canadian stations for one season. This series was produced by Catalena Productions and distributed in America by Rhodes Productions, Catalena's partner company; Catalena was forced into bankruptcy by an unpaid Monty Hall in August 1981. In the fall of 1984, the series returned for a third run in syndication as The All-New Let's Make a Deal. Running for two seasons until 1986, this series was distributed by Telepictures.

NBC revived Let's Make a Deal twice in a 13-year span. The first was a daytime series in 1990 that was the first to not be produced or hosted by Monty Hall. Instead, the show was a production of Ron Greenberg and Dick Clark, and featured Bob Hilton (best known for announcing other game shows) as host (although Hall would eventually return as guest host after Hilton's dismissal).

A primetime edition was launched in 2003 but drew poor ratings and was cancelled after three of its intended five episodes had aired.  This version had reporter Billy Bush as host, and had a significantly larger budget.

A partial remake called Big Deal, hosted by Mark DeCarlo, was broadcast on Fox in 1996. In 1998 and 1999, Buena Vista Television (now Disney–ABC Domestic Television) was in talks with Stone-Stanley (the producers of Big Deal) to create a revival hosted by Gordon Elliott, but it was never picked up. The show was one of several used as part of the summer series Gameshow Marathon on CBS in 2006, hosted by Ricki Lake.

As noted above, CBS revived Let's Make a Deal in 2009. The revival premiered on October 5, 2009, and CBS airs the show daily at 10:00 a.m. and 3:00 p.m. Eastern Time (9:00 a.m. and 2:00 p.m. in other time zones). Like the program that it replaced, the long-running soap opera Guiding Light, affiliates can choose to air it in either time slot; most affiliates, however, prefer the early slot in order to pair the two CBS daytime game shows together (this scheduling strategy is most common in the Eastern Time Zone, where daytime shows air an hour later locally than in later time zones). Markets running the show in the later slot include Bakersfield, Baton Rouge, Chattanooga, Champaign (IL), Chicago, Dayton, Des Moines, Gainesville (FL), Houston, Jefferson City (MO), Kansas City, Las Vegas, Little Rock, Lexington (KY), Macon, Minneapolis, Nashville, New Orleans, Orlando, Peoria, St. Louis, Memphis, and Wichita.

From September 27, 2010 to October 1, 2010, Let's Make a Deal and The Price Is Right aired two episodes a day on an alternating week. CBS did this to fill a gap between the final episode of As the World Turns, which ended a fifty-four-year run on September 17, 2010, and the debut of The Talk. The double-run games aired at 2:00 p.m. Eastern.

Although the current version of the show debuted in September 2009, long after The Price Is Right (which made the switch in 2008, first with primetime episodes in February, then daytime in September) and the two Bell created daytime soap operas had made the switch to high definition, Let's Make a Deal was, along with Big Brother, one of only two programs across the five major networks that was still being actively produced in standard definition. For the start of production for its 2014–15 season in June 2014, Let's Make a Deal began being produced in high definition, with Big Brother 16 making the switch later in June. Let's Make a Deal was the last remaining CBS program to make the switch by air date, with the first HD episode airing on September 22, 2014.

In 2020, Let's Make a Deal Primetime on CBS was announced, making the show one of the first to appear in primetime on the three legacy networks as a regular primetime series. Three primetime episodes were announced, with the first airing October 27 as part of CBS launching both of their daytime game shows' pandemic-delayed seasons in primetime, the second on December 1 featuring guest star Phil Keoghan, and the third, a Holiday-themed episode with families on December 22. Three more primetime episodes aired during the 2021-22 season and additional primetime editions will air during the 2022–23 season.

Past personnel

Monty Hall was the host of nearly every episode of Let's Make a Deal that aired from 1963 until 1986, the family has been involved on all versions of the show in one form or another.  This encompassed the entire original daytime series, which ran until 1976, as well as the accompanying primetime episodes that aired on both NBC and ABC and the three syndicated productions that launched in 1971, 1980, and 1984. He was absent only twice during that span due to illness; in 1971 Dennis James was called on to substitute while in 1985 Geoff Edwards hosted a week of episodes while Hall recovered from a bout of laryngitis.

Bob Hilton became the new host for the NBC 1990 series; however, due to low ratings, Hilton was fired from the show and in October 1990, Hall returned to the show (but was announced as "guest host") and remained as host until the series was canceled in January 1991. Billy Bush emceed the 2003 series, with Hall making a cameo appearance in one episode.  

Each Let's Make a Deal announcer also served as a de facto assistant host, as many times the announcer would be called upon to carry props across the trading floor. The original announcer for the series was Wendell Niles, who was replaced by Jay Stewart in 1964. Stewart remained with Let's Make a Deal until the end of the syndicated series in 1977. The 1980 Canadian-produced syndicated series was announced by Chuck Chandler. The 1984 syndicated series had Brian Cummings in the announcer/assistant role for its first season, with disc jockey Dean Goss taking the position for the following season. The 1990 NBC revival series was announced by Dean Miuccio, with the 2003 edition featuring Vance DeGeneres in that role. The current version on CBS has had comedian Jonathan Mangum as its announcer since it debuted in 2009, with assistant Chris "Money Fairy" Ahern filling in for Mangum on a few episodes during Season 14 when Mangum was not cleared to participate in taping because of illness.

The longest tenured prize model on Let's Make a Deal was Carol Merrill, who stayed with the series from its debut until 1977. The models on the 1980s series were Maggie Brown, Julie Hall (1980), Karen LaPierre, and Melanie Vincz (1984). For the 1990 series, the show featured Georgia Satelle and identical twins Elaine and Diane Klimaszewski, who later gained fame as the Klimaszewski Twins.

Hall (2010 and 2013) and Merrill (2013) both appeared on the current Brady version, each making one-week appearances. The 2013 celebration of the franchise's 50th anniversary was Hall's last official appearance on the show prior to his death, but Hall also appeared in 2017 CBS publicity shots with Brady as part of a CBS Daytime publicity photo celebrating the network's daytime ratings. Hall served as a consultant on the show from 2009 until his death, although episodes which he worked continued to air into 2018 because of taping days (Hall's death resulted in a later-season episode to be repurposed and aired earlier as a memorial episode). After the acquisition of Hatos-Hall by Marcus/Glass Productions, his daughter Sharon became a consultant to the show.

When the current version debuted in 2009 at Las Vegas, Alison Fiori was the show's original model, lasting for much of the first season in Las Vegas before the show moved to Los Angeles.  During the 2013–14 season, Danielle Demski was the show's model for most of the season while Tiffany Coyne was on parental leave, and remains as Coyne's backup when necessary, most recently during the 2019–20 season.

Production locations
The original daytime series was recorded at NBC Studios in Burbank, California, and then at ABC Television Center in Los Angeles once the program switched networks in 1968. The weekly syndicated series also taped at ABC Television Center, doing so for its first five seasons. After ABC cancelled the daytime series in 1976, production of the syndicated series ceased there as well and the sixth and final season was recorded in the ballroom of the Westgate Las Vegas hotel in Las Vegas, Nevada.

The 1980 Canadian series was taped at Panorama Film Studios in West Vancouver, British Columbia, which production company Catalena Productions used as its base of operations. The All-New Let's Make a Deal taped its first season of episodes in Burbank at NBC Studios, then moved to Sunset Las Palmas Studios in Hollywood, California, for the second and final season. The 1990 NBC daytime series was recorded at Disney-MGM Studios on the grounds of Walt Disney World in Orlando, Florida. The 2003 revival returned production to Burbank.

The current edition of the series first originated from the Tropicana in Las Vegas. The show returned to Hollywood in 2010, first at Sunset Bronson Studios from 2010-2015 and later at Raleigh Studios from 2015-2017. From 2017-2022, the show taped at Saticoy Studios in Van Nuys, California. During the 2022-23 season, the show tapes at Quixote Studios in Sylmar, California. In the 2023-24 season, the show will be taping at Haven Studios in Glendale California, which RTL Group (parent of Fremantle) is an investor, where The Price is Right will move for the season.

Music
The theme music for the 1963-77 versions was composed by Sheldon Allman. The theme, along with all incidental music, was performed by an in-studio combo led by Ivan Ditmars, consisting of an electric organ, guitar, drums, and on the nighttime version, a harp. In some seasons of the nighttime show, the combo was further augmented by a horn section. The final season of the nighttime show taped in Las Vegas eliminated the in-studio band in favor of pre-recorded tracks, due to Ivan Ditmars' retirement.

The 1980-81 theme, composed by Stan Worth, was an updated version of the original theme, with more of a disco sound.

The 1984-86 version featured a brand new theme provided by Score Productions, although original composer Sheldon Allman returned as music director for the first season. Todd Thicke replaced Allman in that role for the second season. Both music directors utilized music from previous Hatos-Hall shows, such as Split Second, as incidental cues during the show.

The 2009 revival features another new theme composed by Brian Teed. Since 2011, keyboardist Cat Gray has provided in-studio musical accompaniment.

Format

Gameplay

Each episode of Let's Make a Deal consists of several "deals" between the host and one or more members of the studio audience, referred to as "traders." Audience members are picked at the host's whim as the show moves along, and married couples are often selected to play together as traders. The deals are mini-games within the show that take several formats.

In the simplest format, a trader is given a prize or cash amount of medium value (on the order of a few hundred dollars), and the host offers them the opportunity to trade for an unknown prize. This latter item may be concealed on the stage behind one of three curtains, within a large "box" onstage (large panels painted to look like a box), inside a smaller box carried on a tray, or occasionally in other formats. On occasion, the initial prize may itself be hidden behind a curtain, or in a box or some other container.

Technically, traders are supposed to bring something to trade in, but this rule has seldom been enforced. On several occasions, a trader is actually asked to trade in an item such as their shoes or purse, only to receive the item back at the end of the deal as a "prize". On at least one occasion, the purse was taken backstage and a high-valued prize such as the ignition key to a new car was placed inside of it.

Prizes generally consist of either cash or merchandise with genuine value, such as a trip, electronics, furniture, appliances, or a car. At times, a small prize (typewriter, pocket tape recorder, etc.) may contain a cash bonus or a written/recorded message awarding cash or a larger prize to a trader who has chosen it. Traders who choose boxes or curtains are at risk of receiving booby prizes called "zonks," which can be outlandish items (live animals, junked cars, giant articles of clothing, etc.) or legitimate prizes with relatively very little value (wheelbarrows, giant teddy bears, piles of food, etc.). On rare occasions, a trader receives a zonk that proves to be a cover-up for a valuable prize, such as a fur coat hidden inside a garbage can.

Though usually considered joke prizes, traders legally win the zonks. However, after the taping of the show, any trader who had been zonked is offered a consolation prize (currently $100) instead of having to take home the actual zonk. This is partly because some of the zonks are impractical or physically impossible to receive or deliver to the traders (such as live animals or a stagehand wearing an animal costume), or the props are owned by the studio. A disclaimer at the end of the credits of later 1970s episodes read "Some traders accept reasonable duplicates of zonk prizes." Starting in the 2012–13 season, CBS invited viewers to provide zonk ideas to producers. At the end of the season, the viewer whose zonk was judged the most creative won $2,500, and other viewers' zonk ideas were also used. Whenever a viewer-submitted zonk appeared on the show, the announcer credited its originator. The contest has been continued throughout the past several seasons after its 2012 introduction.

Quickie Deals
As the end credits of the show roll, it is typical for the host to ask random members of the studio audience to participate in fast deals. In the current Wayne Brady version, these are often referred to as "quickie deals", and are conducted by the host, announcer, and model each. CBS will post information on the show's Twitter address (@LetsMakeADeal) days before taping to encourage audience members to carry certain items in their pockets in order to win an additional $100-$500 when the host, announcer, or model approaches them at the end of the show and asks to see such items. The deals are usually in the form of the following:
Offering cash to a person for possessing a certain item.
Offering cash to a person for answering a question about what happened earlier in the show.
Paying a small cash amount for each instance of a certain item (coins, paperclips, etc.) that a person can produce.
Offering cash for each instance of a particular digit in the serial number on a dollar bill, driver's license, etc.
Offering to pay the last check in the person's checkbook, if they had one, up to a certain limit (usually $500 or $1,000).
Offering cash to one person if they can correctly state the exact value of the Big Deal of the Day, or the name of the contestant who played for it.
Offering $500 to one person if they brought a specified item listed on the show's Twitter account.
Offering cash to one person if they can correctly choose which one of two photos appeared on the show's Instagram account.
Offering cash to one person if they can correctly answer a question relating to their costume.
Offering cash to one person if they can correctly guess how much money ($100, $200, or $300) was in the announcer's hand.

Starting with the 2021-22 season as the show modified its format due to the COVID pandemic, players at home play the Quickie Deals round the same way as the in-studio contestants.

Other deal formats
Deals are often more complicated than the basic format described above. Additionally, some deals take the form of games of chance, and others are played as pricing games.

Trading deals
Types of trading deals employed on the show include:

Choosing one of several envelopes/wallets/purses that contain various amounts of money. At least one of them conceals a pre-announced value (usually $1 or $5), which awards a car or trip; the others contain larger amounts as consolation prizes. Each trader must decide whether to keep or trade the one he/she chose.
Making decisions for another person, such as a spouse or a series of unrelated traders, or every member of a team receiving the same item based on majority vote. Sometimes after several offers, a team is broken up and each individual trader can make one final deal on his/her own.
Two or more traders guessing the weight of a studio audience member chosen by the host, with cash awarded to the trader whose guess is closer.
Being told the weight or number of items in a prize behind a box or curtain, and then choosing to keep it or sell it back to the host for a certain price per pound/item.
Being offered a quantity of some foreign currency, and then choosing to receive its equivalent in United States dollars or trade it for a box/curtain.
Being presented with an item having an unknown cash value, such as a claim check or gift certificate, and deciding whether to keep or trade it. Variations have included a cash box, to which the host adds packets of money at intervals; a shopping bag, to which he adds grocery items containing money; or a package of some grocery item such as candy or gum that may or may not contain money. Over the course of the episode, the trader holding the item is given several opportunities to exchange it for a box, curtain, or chance to win a large prize; in each case, the option he/she declines is given to another trader. Typically, but not always, the last trader holding the item is given the first chance to return it and play for the Big Deal. The total cash value of the item (if any) is revealed only after the trader has made his/her decision or, on occasion, during the closing credits.

Games of chance
A wide variety of chance-based games have been used on the show. Examples:
Collecting a certain amount of money hidden inside wallets, envelopes, etc., or by pressing unlabeled buttons on a cash register, in order to reach a pre-stated "selling price" for a larger prize, such as a car, trip or larger amount of cash. Typically, there may also be one or more zonk items hidden which end the game immediately and forfeit all winnings if found. The trader may choose to stop at any time and keep all the money found. The cash register game used 15 buttons, two of which would ring up "No Sale" as the zonk. If a trader found one of these, he/she was offered a chance to press one more button and receive the amount rung up (sometimes doubled by the host), or win either a larger amount or the grand prize for finding the other "No Sale."  In the current CBS version, the game is played using a board with 13 cash amounts and two zonks.
Choosing one of several items in the hope that it will lead to cash or a prize (e.g., a key that unlocks a safe, or an egg that is raw instead of hard-boiled). Before the host tests the chosen item to see if it is a winner, the trader is offered a chance to exchange it for a box/curtain. This game is often played with multiple traders, and more than one of the offered items may win the prize. 
Games involving a deck of cards in which a trader must find matching cards, draw cards that reach a cumulative total within a certain number of draws, draw a certain number of cards from a certain suit to win a designated prize (with one suit always designated as going toward a "zonk," which ends the game with nothing won), etc. to win a prize or additional money.
Receiving clues about an unknown prize (such as a partial spelling of the prize or clues in the form or rap, rhyme, etc.) and deciding whether to take the unknown prize or a cash prize.
Choosing face-down number cards from a board in the hope of winning prizes by out-scoring a rival trader or the host.
Receiving money in the form of a long strip of bills dispensed one at a time from a machine. The trader can end the game at any time and keep the accumulated money, but he/she forfeits it if a blank sheet or a card marked "curtains" appears. Updated versions of the game involve an ATM; the trader inserts a card and begins to withdraw cash, but an "overdrawn" message on the screen at any time ends the game and forfeits the money.
Choosing between a known cash prize and a chance to spin a carnival wheel, which can award a car, larger/smaller cash amounts, or a zonk. 
Rolling dice to receive cash based upon the roll or achieving a cumulative score within a certain number of rolls to win a larger prize.
Depending on the game, the trader is given the opportunity to stop playing at various points, keeping any cash/prizes already won or accepting an offer of a guaranteed prize, or continue to play and risk losing everything.

Pricing games
Other deals related to pricing merchandise are featured in order to win a larger prize or cash amount. Sometimes traders are required to price individual items (either grocery products or smaller prizes generally valued less than $100) within a certain range to win successively larger prizes or a car. Other times traders must choose an item that a pre-announced price, order grocery items or small prizes from least to most expensive, or two items with prices that total a certain amount to win a larger prize. These games are not used on the CBS version because of their similarities to The Price is Right.

Quiz games
On the CBS version, due to the similarities of the pricing game concept with The Price Is Right, quiz games are used instead. These deals involve products in the form of when they were introduced to the market, general knowledge quizzes, currency exchange rates (at the time of taping), or knowledge of geography of trips to certain locales used as prizes.

Big Deal
The Big Deal serves as the final segment of the show and offers a chance at a significantly larger prize for a lucky trader. Before the round, the value of the day's Big Deal is announced to the audience.

The process for choosing traders (two up to 2003, one since 2009) has remained the same. Starting with the highest winner, the host asks traders if they wanted to trade in everything they had won to that point for a chance to choose one of three numbered doors on the stage. The process continued until a trader agreed to play; up to 2003, the procedure continued until a second trader was chosen. In two-player games until 2003, the trader who was the bigger winner earned first choice of the doors, and the other trader then chose from the remaining two.

Each of the doors conceals either a prize package of some sort, or a cash award hidden inside a prop such as a bank vault, piggy bank, or blank check. On occasion, a door containing an all-cash prize is opened before the traders make their choices, but the amount of the prize is not revealed. Frequently but not always, the value of the "Low" Door (the lowest-valued door) is less than the value of the player's original winnings, while the "Medium" Door's value is at least $1,000 more than the player's traded winnings.

When the Big Deal is not behind the selected door, one of the non-Big Deal doors is opened first, then the chosen door, with the Big Deal revealed last, although second on rare occasions. If that occurs, the contestant is told they'll still get something great. If the Big Deal door is selected, the other two doors are usually revealed first, although on rare occasions, the Big Deal door has been revealed second, after one of the other two doors (usually the "Medium" door) is revealed.

The Big Deal prize is usually the most extravagant on each episode, and is often a car, a vacation with first-class accommodations, or a collection of high-value furniture/appliances. On occasion, the Big Deal consists of one of the all-cash prizes mentioned above; at other times, a cash bonus is added to the prizes in the Big Deal to bring the total up to the announced value. On other occasions, the prize consists of "Everything in the Big Deal," which awards the cash/merchandise behind all three doors to the trader who chooses it.

Traders who have won zonks become eligible for the Big Deal only if not enough winners of actual cash/prizes volunteer to play. The Big Deal is the only time during the show in which participants are guaranteed to receive a genuine prize, although that prize could always be far less in value than the prize(s) the contestant traded away. (There was a deliberately placed Zonk in a door during the pilot episode, which was not chosen, but it has never been allowed in a legal episode for broadcast.)

Super Deal
During the 1975–76 syndicated season, winners of the Big Deal were offered a chance to win the "Super Deal". At this point, Big Deals were limited to a range of $8,000 to $10,000. The trader could risk their Big Deal winnings on a shot at adding a $20,000 cash prize, which was hidden behind only one of three mini-doors onstage. The other two doors contained cash amounts of $1,000 or $2,000; however, the $1,000 value was later replaced with a "mystery" amount between $1,000 and $9,000. A trader who decided to play risked their Big Deal winnings and selected one of the mini-doors. If the $20,000 prize was behind the door, the trader kept the Big Deal and added the $20,000 prize, for a potential maximum total of $30,000. However, if a trader selected one of the other two doors, he or she forfeited the Big Deal prizes but kept the cash amount behind the door. The Super Deal was discontinued when the show permanently moved to Las Vegas for the final season (1976–77), and Big Deal values returned to the previous range of $10,000 to $15,000.

From 2012 to 2016 of the Brady version, the Super Deal was offered as a limited event (usually for a week of shows promoted as "Super Deal Week") and was not played regularly. The show designated one or two weeks of episodes, typically airing during a special event (e.g., the 500th episode, 50th anniversary of franchise, etc.). In this version, the top cash prize was $50,000 while the other two cash prizes were $1,000 and $2,000. In addition, instead of using mini-doors, the cash amounts were hidden in three large colored envelopes of red, green, and blue, respectively referred by Brady as ruby, emerald, and sapphire.

Trip-Tastic
In the 2019 premiere week, a variant called “Trip-Tastic” was played. At three random points in the game, Tiffany will show the dealer a golden ticket. This ticket allows them to play Trip-Tastic. The round is played as follows: the three envelopes, ruby, emerald, and sapphire, are now attached to a map of the Earth. The first ticket holder makes a choice. Then, the second chooses between the remaining 2, leaving one envelope for the last ticket holder. After that, Wayne will reveal the envelope holding $500. Then he opens another envelope. The one that has the ticket, wins not one, not two but three trips. The others leave with $500 and $1,000, respectively.

Mega-Deal week
For season premiere weeks in 2015 and 2016 of the Brady version, Big Deal of the Day winners had an opportunity to win every non-zonk, non-cash prize from that day's episode as a "Mega-Deal". Prior to the start of the Big Deal, the contestant picked both a Big Deal curtain and one of seven Mega Deal cards (reduced by one for each day that the Mega Deal was not won that week). Unlike the Super Deal, the contestant does not risk their winnings in the Mega Deal. Only if the contestant won the Big Deal would the contestant's card be revealed. If the card was the Mega Deal, they won every non-zonk, non-cash prize on the show that day. Regardless, at the end of the Big Deal, whichever door was chosen was the contestant's to keep.

Mash-Up Week
The week of May 9, 2016 was designated Mash-Up Week. During each of the five broadcast days, Deal and sister show The Price Is Right each featured one game from the other's lineup. The games were slightly modified to reflect the nature of the shows on which they were played; those on TPIR required contestants to price items, while those on Deal used random draws and the offer of cash/prize deals to stop a game early. Mash-Up Week returned to both shows the week of March 23, 2020.

"Mega Money Mondays", "Worldwide Wednesdays" & "Fabulous Car Fridays"
Starting with Season 13, the Monday and Friday shows have had their own ongoing themes. In Season 14, an additional theme was added for the Wednesday shows.

Mondays are Mega Money Mondays, meaning that one player is guaranteed to win a large amount of cash. The amount for each Monday episode is usually $10,000, but could be as much as $50,000. The prize could either be offered as the main prize for a Trading deal, or added on as an additional prize to another prize package. On occasion, it has even been hidden in a Zonk prize. On at least one occasion, since it had not been won during regular game play, the $10,000 was given as a prize for a Quickie Deal at the end of the show (in this case, it was substituted for the usual $500 prize given to a Twitter follower for bringing the requested item of the day).

Wednesdays are Worldwide Wednesdays, where one Trader has a chance to win a trip to exotic destinations anywhere in the world. The value of the trip is worth over $30,000. 

Fridays were Fabulous Car Fridays, where one Trading game was played for a car worth over $30,000. These have included BMWs, Porsches, Mercedes-Benzes and—on one occasion—a Lamborghini worth over $347,000. On these shows, the game with the car is the only one played for a car as the main prize (other episodes usually have two "car games"); typically, the other "car game's" prize is replaced by a cash amount of $10,000, $15,000 or $20,000. This theme did not return for Season 14, however the episodes airing during the weeks of September 19, 2022 and January 30th, 2023 were designated Fabulous Car Week.

Reception
Upon the original Let's Make a Deals debut, journalist Charles Witbeck was skeptical of the show's chances of success, noting that the previous four NBC programs to compete with CBS's Password had failed. Some critics described the show as "mindless" and "demeaning to traders and audiences alike".

By 1974, however, the show had spent more than a decade at or near the top of daytime ratings, and became the highest-rated syndicated primetime program. It was so popular that, when Hall moved the Let's Make a Deal to ABC because of a contract dispute, doing so greatly damaged NBC's daytime ratings and greatly improved ABC's. The show held the world's record for the longest waiting list for tickets in show-business history; there were 350 seats available for each show, and a wait time of two to three years after requesting a ticket.

In 2001, Let's Make a Deal was ranked as #18 on TV Guides list of "The 50 Greatest Game Shows of All Time". In 2006, GSN aired a series of specials counting down its own list of the "50 Greatest Game Shows of All Time", on which Let's Make a Deal was #7.

In 2014, the American series won a Daytime Creative Arts Emmy Award for Outstanding Original Song for "30,000 Reasons to Love Me", composed by Cat Gray and sung by Wayne Brady.

Episode status
ABC Daytime: A clip from the ABC daytime premiere was used on the Biography episode profiling Hall, which aired during the series' "Game Show Week" in December 1999. Another episode from 1969 was found, which features a gaffe that Hall himself rated as his most embarrassing moment on Let's Make a Deal – at the end of the show, he attempted to make a deal with a woman carrying a baby's bottle. Noting that it had a removable rubber nipple, he offered the woman $100 if she could show him another nipple (she did not do so). Episodes substitute-hosted by Dennis James exist in his personal library; a portion of one such episode is widely circulated as part of a pitch film for James' version of The Price Is Right.
ABC Nighttime/1971–77 Syndicated: Episodes have been seen on GSN in the past. The CBN Cable Network reran the syndicated series in the 1980s and its successor, The Family Channel, from June 7, 1993 to March 29, 1996. Buzzr also aired the series in 2015 and 2016. 
The 1980-81 version continued to air in reruns on Canada's Global Television Network through the late 1980s.
The 1984–86 syndicated version has been seen on GSN in the past. Reruns previously aired on the USA Network from December 29, 1986 to December 30, 1988 and The Family Channel from August 30, 1993 to March 29, 1996. Buzzr began airing episodes from 1985 on June 1, 2016; this version returned to Buzzr's schedule on September 30, 2019, then aired until March 20, 2021 and will return July 18, 2022 for a limited run then will permanently return to the Buzzr schedule on August 1, 2022. GameTV in Canada aired 40 episodes of this version starting in July 2018, as part of their Game Show Retro block, until it was dropped in October 2018.
The 1990s NBC version has not been seen since its cancellation. 
The 2003 NBC prime time version only aired three of the five episodes produced, with no rebroadcasts since.
Reruns from Brady's hosting run were added to their own standalone channel on Pluto TV in July 2022.

International versions
Rights were formerly held by RTL Group worldwide, but under current owners Marcus Lemonis and Nancy Glass, international rights are held by Can't Stop Media except for countries where it currently is produced by RTL. The show has been licensed the show to 22 countries.

Notes

Merchandise
In 1964, Milton Bradley released a home version of Let's Make a Deal featuring gameplay somewhat different from the television show. In 1974, Ideal Toys released an updated version of the game featuring Hall on the box cover, which was also given to all traders on the syndicated version in the 1974–75 season. An electronic tabletop version by Tiger Electronics was released in 1998. In the late summer of 2006, an interactive DVD version of Let's Make a Deal was released by Imagination Games, which also features classic clips from the Monty Hall years of the show. In 2010, Pressman Toy Corporation released an updated version of the box game, with gameplay more similar to the 1974 version, featuring Brady on the box cover.

Various U.S. lotteries have included instant lottery tickets based on Let's Make a Deal.

In 1999, the website BuyBidWin.com licensed the rights to Let's Make a Deal as it launched a website featuring Monty Hall.

In 1999, Shuffle Master teamed up with Bally's to do a video slot machine game based on the show with the voice and likeness of Monty Hall.

In 2004, IGT (International Gaming Technology) did a new video slot game based on the show still featuring Monty Hall.

In 2004, the now defunct website GameShow24.com was going to release a beta game based on Let's Make a Deal.

In 2012, a Facebook game based on the Wayne Brady version was released by RealNetwork's GameHouse.

In 2013, Aristocrat Technology did an all-new video slot machine game based on the Wayne Brady version.

Monty Hall problem
The Monty Hall problem, also called the Monty Hall paradox, is a famous question in probability theory presented as a hypothetical game on the show. In this game, a contestant is allowed to choose among three doors that conceal a true prize and two zonks. After this choice is made, the host opens a door that was not chosen and conceals a zonk, and then offers to trade the contestant's original choice for the item behind the other unopened door. The problem is to determine whether taking the trade improves the contestant's chance of winning. The correct answer is that it does, although people often reach the opposite conclusion through faulty reasoning.

In an interview with The New York Times reporter John Tierney in 1991, Hall confirmed that when the host behaves strictly according to the problem description, it is advantageous for the contestant to take the trade. Yet as host on the show, he could decide which trades to offer based on the contestants' prior choices, which allowed him to play on them psychologically and control the number of wins.

References

External links
Official website
CBS's website for the show

CBC Television Archives profile of Monty Hall with behind-the-scenes footage of Let's Make a Deal (1970)
"Geh Aufs Ganze!" the 1992–2003 (German version) of "Let's Make A Deal" courtesy of Grundy Light Entertainment
description of "Geh Aufs Ganze!" (Original website)
Official site of Super Deal 2 Milyar (2010) via internet archive
Article about the 2004 Spain version
Monty Hall interview on TVParty.com

Let's Make a Deal
1980s Canadian game shows
CBS original programming
NBC original programming
American Broadcasting Company original programming
First-run syndicated television programs in the United States
1963 American television series debuts
1977 American television series endings
1980 American television series debuts
1981 American television series endings
1984 American television series debuts
1986 American television series endings
1990 American television series debuts
1991 American television series endings
2003 American television series debuts
2003 American television series endings
2009 American television series debuts
1960s American game shows
1970s American game shows
1980s American game shows
1990s American game shows
2000s American game shows
2010s American game shows
2020s American game shows
Television productions suspended due to the COVID-19 pandemic
Television series by Stefan Hatos-Monty Hall Productions
Television series by CBS Studios
Television series by Warner Bros. Television Studios
Television series by Fremantle (company)
Television series by Dick Clark Productions
Television shows filmed in Los Angeles
American television series revived after cancellation
English-language television shows
Television series by Telepictures
1960s Australian game shows
1970s Australian game shows
1990s Australian game shows